A homoeoid is a shell (a bounded region) bounded by two concentric, similar ellipses (in 2D) or ellipsoids (in 3D).
When the thickness of the shell becomes negligible, it is called a thin homoeoid. The name homoeoid was coined by Lord Kelvin and Peter Tait.

Mathematical definition
If the outer shell is given by

.

The thin homoeoid is then given by the limit

Physical meaning
A homoeoid can be used as a construction element of a matter or charge distribution. The gravitational or electromagnetic potential of a homoeoid homogeneously filled with matter or charge is constant inside the shell. This means that a test mass or charge will not feel any force inside the shell.

See also
Focaloid

References

External links

Surfaces
Mathematical physics
Potentials